Loyd Hayden Riley (September 14, 1921 – April 24, 1995) was an American college basketball coach.  He was the head coach of the Alabama Crimson Tide for eight seasons during the 1960s, and the Tide's head baseball coach for ten seasons in the 1970s. Riley was also a recruiting coordinator for football at Alabama under Paul "Bear" Bryant.

College and military
Born and raised in Guin, Alabama, Riley was a four-sport athlete in high school and played football, basketball, and baseball at Howard College (now Samford University).  He entered the U.S. Navy in 1942 and was stationed at NAS Pensacola in the nearby Florida panhandle as a physical trainer.  Following his discharge from the military, he returned to college at the University of Alabama in Tuscaloosa, where he lettered in basketball and baseball. He earned a bachelor's degree in physical education in August 1948 and earned a master's degree in 1953.

Coaching
Just days after earning his degree, Riley was the head coach of baseball and basketball at Coffee High School in Florence. He stayed for a decade, and his basketball team won the state championship in 1951, with high finishes in other years. One of his players at Coffee was Wimp Sanderson, a future assistant under Riley at Alabama and later the Tide's head coach. Riley was also the head football coach at CHS for three seasons, beginning in 1955. He moved to the University of Alabama in 1958 as a football assistant to Bear Bryant (also Alabama's athletic director) Hayden was one of the Best recruiters and evaluation of talent. He had an unbelievable talent of remembering anybody's name and from his stent in the Navy knew people all over the nation which helped in the recruiting and assistant basketball coach under Eugene Lambert. When Lambert left in 1960, Riley was promoted to head basketball coach.  After eight seasons, Riley suffered his first losing season and resigned in 1968, and continued as an assistant athletic director. In 1970, he succeeded Joe Sewell as head baseball coach for ten seasons and stepped down due to health reasons in 1979.

Riley served in the athletic department at Alabama until 1982, then became commissioner of the Gulf South Conference from 1982 for two years. He suffered a stroke in 1987 and was confined to a wheelchair, and lived at the VA hospital in Tuscaloosa. Riley died of a heart attack in 1995 at age 73, and was buried in Tuscaloosa.

A city park in his hometown of Guin is named for him.

Personal
Riley was married to the former Lauranne Kudrop of Greenville and they had three children, two sons and a daughter. Riley had five sisters and was the older brother of football coach Bud Riley (1925–2012), who was the father of Mike Riley, the former head football coach at Oregon State and Nebraska. Nephew Mike (b.1953) played football at Alabama as a reserve defensive back in the early 1970s while Hayden was the head baseball coach. Another nephew, Major Ogilvie, was a running back in the Tide's wishbone offense from 1977 through 1980 and won two national championships. Ogilvie is the son of Riley's sister Peggy.

References

External links
 Lauderdale County Sports Hall of Fame profile
 

1921 births
1995 deaths
Alabama Crimson Tide baseball coaches
Alabama Crimson Tide football coaches
Alabama Crimson Tide men's basketball coaches
Alabama Crimson Tide men's basketball players
American men's basketball coaches
American men's basketball players
Basketball coaches from Alabama
Basketball players from Alabama
College men's basketball head coaches in the United States
Guards (basketball)
Gulf South Conference commissioners
Howard Hawks baseball players
Howard Hawks men's basketball players
People from Marion County, Alabama
Samford Bulldogs baseball players
Samford Bulldogs football players
Samford Bulldogs men's basketball players
United States Navy personnel of World War II